Fairfield Showground is a multi-purpose indoor-outdoor venue situated in Prairiewood, New South Wales, Australia. Since in the 1970s, it has been a popular venue for multicultural festivals, horse racing, carnivals, markets and club meets attracting as many as 20,000 people. Situated in western Sydney, the showground has around 10,000 sqm of undercover exhibition space and it is overall 33 hectares (79 acres) in size, with parking spaces for over 600 vehicles.

One of the largest festival precinct in Greater Western Sydney, the showground was developed in the 1950s and is surrounded by  eucalyptus bushland, with Orphan School Creek meandering on the north.

Markets

Markets are held at Fairfield Showground every Saturday from 9am to 4pm in the sheltered area behind the grandstands. The markets are a popular attraction, with space for 600+ stalls, free entry, food & drink stands and thousands of visitors every weekend. The markets include of toy stores, food booths, dollar stores, sporting gear shops, grocery, hardware, gardening, jewelry, and pet supplies. Additional market nights have been held irregularly. These have included Aussie Night Markets on Tuesday once per month, with the primary interest being the large number of international cuisine on offer, such as Turkish, Korean, Chinese and Mexican with over 40 multicultural street foods and dessert vendors, 20 craft stores, DJ performances, and also a boutique retail section.
 The markets were closed down periodically during the COVID-19 pandemic.

Entertainment is also provided for children on most weekends. This can include pony rides, merry-go-round, clown heads, a jumping castle, and a mini-train ride system which circulates the bushy surroundings.

Facilities
The Parklands Function Centre is used for engagement parties, wedding receptions, anniversaries, school reunions and award presentation nights for up to 250 people. Adjacent to the Showground is the 18-hole Fairfield public golf course. The function centre was used as a central hub for Fairfield's 2021 Local Council elections. 

A harness racing track and club was located on the grounds from late 1964 through to June 2017 when it closed & was demolished to facilitate the large redevelopment. It had ceased full time racing operations in 2004.

Redevelopment
From 2017 onwards the site was significantly redeveloped. In a joint commitment by Fairfield Council, the NSW Government, and the Federal Government, the $28 million redevelopment of the Showground includes three large playing fields, two for football and one for AFL. The main pitch is a FIFA-accredited synthetic field, with the training pitch a regulation turf field. A sports training facility was built in between the three fields, and with the two main football fields complete, the Showgrounds have been used as the training base for A-League club Macarthur FC.

Fairfield City Council has announced that the facilities would be available for any Sydney bid to host the Commonwealth Games. Frank Carbone has said Fairfield Showground should be included in any Games proposal saying, “We are looking at investing almost $10 million into the showground, and also seeking more funding for further upgrades”. The instance to host the 2026 or 2030 Games in greater western Sydney was put to Premier Gladys Berejiklian and Sports Minister Stuart Ayres.

COVID Testing
The showground made national news headlines in July 2021 after a COVID-19 testing clinic and a vaccination hub were opened in its premises. The area had been a hotspot for cases as well as significant testing demand due to the NSW Government's locality based mandatory testing regime. As a drive in testing facility with limited road access, traffic was backed up for multiple kilometres with waiting times up of to 6 hours. Demand eased when an additional facility was opened at the Endeavour Sports Park, 3 kilometres east of the Showground.

Culture
  
Assyrian Australians celebrate the Assyrian New Year annually on 1 April, in Fairfield Showground. Thousands attend the New Year festival and it usually features music and theatrical performances, traditional dancers, food stalls and fireworks. Former Australian prime minister Tony Abbott and other politicians such as Chris Bowen, Craig Kelly, Tanya Plibersek, Chris Hayes and former NSW premier Bob Carr have attended the festival and made a speech. The Assyrian Australian Latin pop band Azadoota regularly performs in the annual festival.

The showground is also home to the Australia's first, largest and longest-running Eid Festival, which commenced in 1987. The festival has grown to now cater for tens of thousands of Muslims and non-Muslims and has included as guests Yusuf Islam, famous Australian footballer, Hazem El Masri, the then Governor-General of Australia, Michael Jeffery and the previous Premier of New South Wales, Kristina Keneally.

The Chinese New Year is annually celebrated in the showground with over 60,000 people attending. More than 40,000 people attend the annual Vietnamese New Year, which is held for three days from Friday to Sunday. Both feature fireworks, amusement rides and cultural performances such as dragon dancing.

The Fairfield Easter Fair will be held annually in the showground for three days starting from 2018 to cater those in the area, which are distant from the Sydney Royal Easter Show in Sydney Olympic Park. With a free admission, it will open on Easter from 10am to 10pm, Friday to Sunday, and it will feature over 20 amusement rides (such as Bumper cars), blacksmith exhibition, farm animals, easter egg hunt, sheep shearing, reptile shows and fireworks, among many things. A Uruguayan festival, which has been running for nearly three decades and raised $2 million of charity, features hundreds of performers and live music acts, is held annually on August and it's one of the biggest outdoor Latin festivals in Sydney's West.

Furthermore, international artists such as AC/DC have performed in the venue in 1975, playing songs from their debut album High Voltage.

Access
The Liverpool-Parramatta Rapid Bus Transitway has a station close to the showground, as well as a number of encircling bus stops that belong to Transit Systems Sydney. Although the main entry is from Smithfield Road, there is another entrance to the showground from Moonlight Road, on the head of Greenfield Road, to the west, which feature a sign indicating the showground's entry.

See also
Stockland Wetherill Park, a nearby mall

References

External links
Official Website
Austadiums

Tourist attractions in Sydney
Sports venues in Sydney
Buildings and structures in Sydney
Harness racing in Australia
Music venues in Australia
Festivals in Sydney
Culture of Sydney
Retail markets in Sydney
Showgrounds in New South Wales